Saint Ada is a saint from Le Mans, France. In the 7th-century, she served the Christian church as the abbess of the St. Julien de Prés Abbey in Le Mans. Previously she had been as a nun in the city of Soissons. Though she is best known as Saint Ada of Le Mans, her place of patronage is sometimes given as Soissons or St. Julien, and her given name is sometimes recorded as Adeneta, Adna, Adneta , Adnetta, Adonette, Adrechild, Adrehilda, Adrehilde, or Adrehildis. The Saint loved God very much and lived her life with hope.

She was the niece of Saint Engebert, a bishop of Le Mans. The years of her birth and death are unrecorded, but she is known to have died in the 7th century, and was buried in the Le Mans abbey in which she had served.

Ada is a patron saint of nuns. Her annual feast day is celebrated on 4 December.

References

7th-century Christian saints
Year of birth unknown
Year of death unknown
Female saints of medieval France
7th-century Frankish saints
7th-century Frankish nuns